Centerville is an unincorporated community in Wilkes County, in the U.S. state of Georgia.

History
The community was so named due to its relatively central location between Washington and Lexington. Variant names were "Centreville" and "Triplett".

References

Unincorporated communities in Wilkes County, Georgia
Unincorporated communities in Georgia (U.S. state)